Shejoun Al-Hajri (born February 8, 1988) is a Kuwaiti actress and broadcaster.

Early career
When Al-Hajri was six, she participated in the Ramadan - Alsoaah or Aoanh.

Filmography

Awards
 Best Actress 2008
 Best Show & Presenter 2009
 Best TV Presenter 2010
 Best GCC Artist 2015
 Best lead actress Show 2016

Personal life
She attended Gulf English School of Kuwait, shes adopted from 2 Kuwaiti parents after being in foster care until she was 13.

References

External links
Shujoun Al-Hajri on Instagram
Profile on Elcinema.com

1988 births
Living people
Kuwaiti film actresses
Kuwaiti women singers
21st-century women singers
Kuwaiti television actresses